5th Vitranc Cup was an alpine skiing competition, held between 19 and 20 February 1966 in Kranjska Gora, SR Slovenia, Yugoslavia. They were hosting two FIS 1A international events.

Official results

Giant slalom 
On 19 February, giant slalom at vertical drop at 515 metres was held.

Slalom 
On 20 February, slalom was held on »Bedanc« (1st) and »Vitranc« (2nd) courses.

References

External links
 

International sports competitions hosted by Yugoslavia
1966 in Yugoslav sport
International sports competitions hosted by Slovenia
Alpine skiing competitions
Alpine skiing in Slovenia
1966 in Slovenia